Francesca Alderisi (born 29 March 1968) is an Italian politician and television presenter. Since 2018, she has been a Senator from Forza Italia representing North and Central America.

Biography 
Born in Treviso of Campania parents, she grew up and lives in Rome. She was a television presenter in the 1990s.

She supported the holding of the 2020 Italian constitutional referendum.

References 

1968 births
Living people
People from Treviso
Mass media people from Rome
Forza Italia (2013) senators
Italian women television presenters
Senators of Legislature XVIII of Italy
21st-century Italian politicians
21st-century Italian women politicians
People of Campanian descent
Politicians from Rome
20th-century Italian women
Women members of the Senate of the Republic (Italy)